Schwarzach may refer to:

 Schwarzach im Pongau, a market town in the St. Johann im Pongau District in the Austrian state of Salzburg
 Schwarzach, Vorarlberg, a municipality in the Austrian state of Vorarlberg
 Schwarzach, Baden-Württemberg, a municipality in the district of Neckar-Odenwald-Kreis, in Baden-Württemberg, Germany
 Schwarzach am Main, a municipality in the district of Kitzingen in Bavaria in Germany
 Schwarzach, Lower Bavaria, a municipality in the district of Straubing-Bogen in Bavaria, Germany
 Schwarzach bei Nabburg, a municipality in the district of Schwandorf in Bavaria, Germany
 Svratka (river) or Schwarzach in German, a river in the South Moravian Region of the Czech Republic
 Schwarzach (Schussen), a river of Baden-Württemberg, Germany, tributary of the Schussen
 Schwarzach (Danube), a river of Baden-Württemberg, Germany, tributary of the Danube
 Schwarzach (Altmühl), a river of Bavaria, Germany, left tributary of the Altmühl
 Schwarzach (Main),  a river of Bavaria, Germany, tributary of the Main
 Schwarzach (Naab), a river of Bavaria, Germany, tributary of the Naab
 Schwarzach (Rednitz), a river of Bavaria, Germany, tributary of the Rednitz